Ololygon aromothyella is a species of frog in the family Hylidae.

It is found in Argentina, Uruguay and possibly Brazil.
Its natural habitats are subtropical or tropical moist lowland forests, subtropical or tropical seasonally wet or flooded lowland grassland, rivers, freshwater marshes, and intermittent freshwater marshes.

Sources

aromothyella
Amphibians described in 2005
Frogs of South America
Taxonomy articles created by Polbot